Bill Lathouwers (born 18 September 1999) is a Belgian footballer who plays as a goalkeeper for K Beerschot VA.

Career
Lathouwers played in the youth and for the reserves of Royal Antwerp. In the 2019–20 season, he was once included in the first team squad of Antwerp, in the cup final which they won 0–1 over Club Brugge. In 2020, he left for Dutch second-tier club MVV Maastricht after a successful trial period, signing a contract on an amateur basis. He made his debut for MVV on 30 August 2020, in a 0–0 away draw against Almere City.

On 22 January 2021, he signed a 1.5-year contract with Waasland-Beveren.

Honours
Royal Antwerp
 Belgian Cup: 2019–20

Career statistics

Club

Notes

References

1999 births
People from Wilrijk
Living people
Belgian footballers
Belgian expatriate footballers
Association football goalkeepers
Royal Antwerp F.C. players
MVV Maastricht players
S.K. Beveren players
Eerste Divisie players
Belgian expatriate sportspeople in the Netherlands
Expatriate footballers in the Netherlands